Lerheimia wulfi is a species of chironomid midge found in the Democratic Republic of the Congo. It is only separable from its congeners from details of the genitalia.

It has previously been placed in the genera Smittia and Pseudosmittia.

References
Lerheimia, a new genus of Orthocladiinae from Africa (Diptera: Chironomidae)

Chironomidae
Insects described in 1956